Corfield v. Coryell (6 Fed. Cas. 546, no. 3,230 C.C.E.D.Pa. 1823) was a landmark decision decided by Justice Bushrod Washington, sitting as a judge for the U.S. Circuit Court for the Eastern District of Pennsylvania. In it, he upheld a New Jersey regulation forbidding non-residents from gathering oysters and clams against a challenge that New Jersey's law violated the Article IV Privileges and Immunities Clause and that the New Jersey law regulated interstate commerce in violation of the Commerce Clause.

Background

In 1820, the New Jersey legislature passed a law that prevented the harvesting of oysters from May until September, and allowing only residents of New Jersey to harvest oysters during the rest of the year. The plaintiff, who was not a New Jersey resident, operated a vessel, the Hiram, in the Maurice river cove in order to harvest oysters. This vessel was then seized according to that New Jersey law.

The plaintiff brought a trespass action in federal court in order to challenge the seizure of the Hiram. The plaintiff also challenged the law on four constitutional grounds:
 It is unconstitutional due to interfering with the Commerce Clause, which gives Congress, not state legislatures, the power to regulate interstate commerce.
 It violates the Privileges and Immunities Clause, which states that, "The Citizens of each State shall be entitled to all Privileges and Immunities of Citizens in the several States."
 It violates Article III Section II of the Constitution, which states that "the judicial power of the United States should extend to all cases of admiralty and maritime jurisdiction."
 It violates the Fourth Amendment, as the seizure was made without a warrant. This argument appears to have been abandoned, as it was not addressed in the Court's opinion.

Decision

The Court ultimately upheld the constitutionality of New Jersey's law.

With regards to the Commerce Clause, Justice Washington found that Congress's power to regulate commerce "does by no means impair the right of the state government to legislate upon all subjects of internal police within their territorial limits ... even although such legislation may indirectly and remotely affect commerce, provided it do not interfere with the regulations of congress upon the same subject." He cited Gibbons v. Ogden in this reasoning, providing verbatim the list of allowed state laws mentioned in that decision: "inspection, quarantine, and health laws; laws regulating the internal commerce of the state; laws establishing and regulating turnpike roads, ferries, canals, and the like." Washington also argued that the New Jersey law does not affect articles of commerce directly, by making a crucial distinction: "the law does not inhibit the buying and selling of oysters after they are lawfully gathered, and have become articles of trade; but it forbids the removal of them from the beds in which they grow." As state laws that regulate the manner of taking of articles of trade such as "[p]aving stones, sand, and many other things" could not possibly be said to be unconstitutional, the Justice concluded that the New Jersey law did not fall afoul of the Commerce Clause.

Next, Washington treated the Privileges and Immunities Clause issue. The perhaps most-cited aspect of Corfield v. Coryell is Justice Washington's listing of the "privileges and immunities" enjoyed by citizens of the United States:

Thus, Washington concluded that the right to harvesting oysters, not being included in the list of these fundamental privileges and immunities of citizens, was not bound to be extended to all non-state citizens. The opinion concluded that "[the right] of fishing belongs to all the citizens or subjects of the state" who are "exclusively entitled to the use of it." Washington also added a practical consideration for this distinction: although the state's supply of oysters "may be abundantly sufficient for the use of the citizens of that state," its supply might be "totally exhausted and destroyed" if citizens from all other states were equally entitled to make use of them.

For the argument that the law violates the judicial power of the United States in cases of admiralty and maritime jurisdiction (enumerated in Article III Section II), the opinion states that this power was likely still vested in the States, not in the national government. Then, the opinion demonstrates how the area in question is within the jurisdiction of both New Jersey and Cumberland County. Finally, the opinion indicates that an action of trespass from the owner of the vessel is not warranted, because as the vessel was rented out to the plaintiff, the owner of the vessel cannot pass such an action.

Influence on the Fourteenth Amendment  
The well-known passage from Corfield was quoted in reference to the first section of the Fourteenth Amendment (substantially authored by John Bingham), during congressional debates on the Amendment, for an indication of what the judiciary had interpreted the phrase "privileges and immunities" to mean as it stood in the original Constitution (Article 4 Section 2), but there is substantial evidence to the effect that some congressmen, at the time the Fourteenth Amendment was passed, did not accept Justice Washington's reading of the term. Justice Washington's assessment is often cited by those who advocate a broader reading of the Fourteenth Amendment Privileges or Immunities Clause than the Supreme Court gave in the Slaughter-House Cases.

See also
Sohappy v. Smith

References

External links
Link to Case from "Founders' Constitution"
  - discussing Justice Bushrod Washington's notes on Corfield v. Coryell at the Chicago History Museum

1823 in United States case law
United States circuit court cases
Privileges and Immunities case law
Legal history of New Jersey
United States District Court case articles without infoboxes
1823 in New Jersey